The 1904–05 Kentucky State men's basketball team competed on behalf of the University of Kentucky during the 1904–05 season. The team finished with a final record of 1–4.

Roster

Schedule

|-
!colspan=12 style="background:#273BE2; color:white;"| Regular Season

References

Kentucky
Kentucky Wildcats men's basketball seasons
1904 in sports in Kentucky
1905 in sports in Kentucky